Darsanam is a 1973 Indian Malayalam film, directed by P. N. Menon and produced by P. C. George. The film stars Adoor Bhasi, Supriya, Sankaradi and Raghavan in the lead roles. The film had musical score by G. Devarajan.

Cast

Adoor Bhasi
Supriya (Fatafat Jayalaxmi)
Sankaradi
Raghavan
Sasidharan Pillai
Balan K. Nair
C. A. Vasantha
E. P. Balakrishnan
Junior Geetha
Junior Raji
Kottarakkara Sreedharan Nair
Kuthiravattam Pappu
Muthu
Oduvil Unnikrishnan
P. K. Udayakumar
Pattambi Subhadra
Pattambi Thankam
Pecheri Xavier
Radhadevi
Ravi Shankar
Rexona
S. K. Palissery
Santha Devi
Saraswathi
Sathyapal
Roja Ramani
Sree Narayana Pillai
Surasu
Susheela

Soundtrack
The music was composed by G. Devarajan and the lyrics were written by Poonthanam and Vayalar Ramavarma.

References

External links
 

1973 films
1970s Malayalam-language films
Films directed by P. N. Menon (director)